Edmund Soame (c. 1669 – 8 September 1706) was an English soldier and politician. He served in the English Army where he attained the rank of colonel, and was member of Parliament for Thetford from 1701 to 1705.

Death
Soame died on board a ship at Torbay on 8 Sept. 1706, aged 37. Laurence Hyde, 1st Earl of Rochester wrote to Robert Harley, 1st Earl of Oxford and Earl Mortimer, ‘I am very much concerned for the death of Colonel Soame, both on your account, and the interest I had myself in him’. The monument erected in West Dereham parish church noted that he had ‘dedicated the revenues of a plentiful estate’ to serving his country, and had proved himself ‘to be as true and brave a patriot in the senate house, as he was a brave and honourable commander in the field’.

References
british-history.ac.uk Retrieved 10 May 2011 - represented Thetford in the Parliament of 1702.

Notes

English MPs 1701–1702
English MPs 1702–1705

English army officers

1660s births
1706 deaths
Year of birth uncertain
Place of birth missing